The 1978–79 British Home Championship was a British Home Nations competition, won by the English football side and notable for seeing marked increases in hooliganism and falling attendance which would result in its cancellation in 1984. The English started well, beating Northern Ireland to match the heavy Welsh victory over Scotland on the same day, which featured a hat trick by John Toshack. Scotland recovered by beating the Irish in their next match while England and Wales played out a goalless draw, leaving three sides theoretically capable of winning the Championship in the final round. Wales could only manage a draw with the Irish and so in the deciding match between England and Scotland, a 1–1 half time score gave the Scots some hope but a strong second half performance from England was rewarded with a deserved 3–1 win. This result gave England the Championship, with Wales in second place. The tournament also saw the introduction of goal difference to separate teams, although it had no effect on the eventual outcome.

Table

Results

References

External links
Full Results and Line-ups

1979
1979 in British sport
1978–79 in Northern Ireland association football
1978–79 in Welsh football
1978–79 in English football
1978–79 in Scottish football